Gianfranco Pieri (born 6 February 1937) is a retired Italian professional basketball player. In 2007, he was inducted into the Italian Basketball Hall of Fame.

Professional career
Pieri was a member of the FIBA European Selection, in 1964. He also won the FIBA European Champions Cup (EuroLeague) 1965–66 season championship.

Italian national team
Pieri was a member of the senior Italian national basketball team that finished fourth and fifth, at the 1960 Summer Olympics, and the 1964 Summer Olympics, respectively.

References

External links

FIBA Profile
FIBA Europe Profile

1937 births
Living people
Basketball players at the 1960 Summer Olympics
Basketball players at the 1964 Summer Olympics
Nuova Pallacanestro Gorizia players
Olimpia Milano players
Olympic basketball players of Italy
Pallacanestro Trieste players
Point guards
Italian men's basketball players